Vulcan (Gabriel Summers) is a fictional character appearing in American comic books published by Marvel Comics. He first appeared in X-Men: Deadly Genesis #1 (January 2006). He is the third Summers brother to be revealed, the younger brother of X-Men characters Cyclops and Havok.

Publication history
Though a third Summers brother was mentioned years before by Sinister during an encounter with Cyclops, Vulcan first appeared in X-Men: Deadly Genesis #1, a story written by Ed Brubaker that ran from January to July 2006. Vulcan then appeared in "The Rise and Fall of the Shi'ar Empire" storyline, also written by Brubaker, in The Uncanny X-Men issues #475 to 486 (September 2006 to July 2007).

After Brubaker left The Uncanny X-Men, Christopher Yost took over as writer beginning with the X-Men: Emperor Vulcan mini-series, which ran from November 2007 to March 2008.

In July, 2008, Marvel.com posted a news article of an alternate cover of Emperor Vulcan featuring the phrase "Who Will Rule?", accompanied by the text "Stay tuned to Marvel.com and get ready for the blockbuster answer at San Diego Comic-Con!" This was all to build up to the "War of Kings" storyline, and Vulcan's part of the story is set up in the Kingbreaker mini-series, written by Yost.

Fictional character biography

Origins

Vulcan's history began on the Shi'ar throneworld, as the unborn child of Christopher Summers (later known as Corsair) and Katherine Summers, parents of Cyclops and Havok. Katherine was pregnant when the Summers were abducted by D'Ken, Majestor of the Shi'ar Imperium. The unborn child was seemingly killed when the mad emperor, in retaliation for an attempt by Corsair to escape, stabbed Katherine and killed her. The fetus was removed from Katherine's lifeless body and placed in an incubation-accelerator, which is used to breed slaves. As a result, the child was aged to the prime of adolescence.

Sent to Earth to become a slave for Erik the Red, the Emperor's hand on Earth, he escaped and was found by Moira MacTaggert with little or no memories of who he was or where he came from. She took him as her ward and instructed him in the use of his nascent powers. He claimed his name was Gabriel, but he chose the code name of Vulcan from a book on Roman mythology, and Charles Xavier recognized his mental imprint as being related to Cyclops and his age suggests he is older. Vulcan became part of a team of X-Men formed by Petra, Darwin, and Sway that attempted to rescue the original X-Men from the sentient island Krakoa. Viewing Vulcan as a menace, Krakoa sent a human-shaped volcano to deal with his team, killing the two women and leaving Darwin and Vulcan for dead.

Deadly Genesis

With the help of his dying teammates, Vulcan was able to survive. Reawakened in modern days by the mutant energies released during M-Day, he returns from his space exile to get revenge against Professor Xavier, killing Banshee in the process, as well as attempting to kill Logan and even kidnapping Rachel Summers and Cyclops.

Vulcan subconsciously uses the absorbed powers of Petra and Sway to manipulate the X-Men, and figures out the truth of the mystery behind the missing team of X-Men that were lost on Krakoa. Vulcan is able to lure Professor Xavier out of hiding, and confronts him in front of the X-Men, wanting the Professor to reveal to them all what really happened to Vulcan and his team. However, Xavier is unable to do so, because, in the wake of M-Day, he is no longer a Mutant. Enraged, Vulcan commands Marvel Girl to link their minds so that everyone can see what transpired. Reluctantly, Rachel does so, and with Xavier as a guide, she is able to not only reveal the truth behind what really happened on Krakoa, but she also detects another consciousness within the mind of Vulcan.

It is revealed that Vulcan and his team rescued Scott from Krakoa (it was previously thought that Krakoa itself released Scott to bring it more victims), and Vulcan was able to hurt the living island, which greatly enraged the creature. Vulcan revealed to Cyclops that they were in fact brothers, and sent Cyclops away on their jet to safety. As the jet took off, Cyclops watched in horror as the living island struck down and seemingly killed Vulcan and his team. Sway was hit first, and severed in two at her torso. Her body released the last of her mutant power to slow time down around them. As Petra was incinerated, she also reacted reflexively and drew them all below the surface into a cave that her power created. There, Vulcan and Darwin lay dying, and Darwin transformed himself into energy and bonded with Vulcan, thus saving them both. They were launched into space along with the Krakoa land mass by Polaris and fell into a state of suspended animation. After the apparent deaths of Vulcan and his team, Cyclops returned to Professor Xavier in a hysterical state, blaming himself for their deaths, and the Professor decided it was best for all involved if he altered their memories to forget about the second team, and spare everyone the agony.

Vulcan thus remained on Krakoa, inert, until the massive backlash of power resulting from M-Day awakened him, whereupon he returned to Earth to confront the X-Men, revealing the truth behind the Krakoa incident to them. With these revelations, Marvel Girl reaches into Vulcan's mind and releases the subconscious inert form of Darwin, which Vulcan expels from his body. Using this opportunity, the X-Men attack him as they deem him too dangerous to be left alone. Vulcan easily repels their attack and flees the planet, renouncing Cyclops as his brother, and heads for space with the vision of D'Ken killing his mother raging in his mind, bent on revenge.

The Rise and Fall of the Shi'ar Empire

While traveling through Shi'ar space, he learns from a crew member whose starship he had destroyed that D'Ken has been comatose for years after his experience in the M'Kraan Crystal and that Lilandra Neramani is the current ruler of the Shi'ar. Undaunted, Vulcan continues on his quest for vengeance by engaging a trio of Shi'ar warships, and destroying two of them, thereby showing his superiority to the crew of the surviving third ship, which Vulcan then commandeers for his own. After reaching the inner territory of the Shi'ar throneworld, Chandilar, the ship is confronted and ordered to surrender by the Imperial Guard. However, the captain of Vulcan's ship had deceived Vulcan as to the Guard's true strength, hoping to use him as a pawn in Vice-Chancellor K'Tor's plan to restore the old Empire; as a result, Vulcan is unprepared for the true power of the Guard, and especially their leader, Gladiator.

Vulcan kills several powerful guardsmen in combat (Neutron, Cosmo, Smasher, and Impulse, among possible others), but is defeated by Gladiator, and taken to a prison moon. He remains a prisoner there until an agent of the Vice-Chancellor frees him from his shackles, and directs him to another cell to free Deathbird.

However, soon afterwards, Deathbird manages to convince him to at least delay his plan for vengeance, after the two become romantically involved. Vulcan then uses his powers to heal D'Ken's injuries. Afterwards, a grateful D'Ken asks Vulcan to marry Deathbird. After his wedding, Vulcan throws Professor Xavier into the M'Kraan Crystal, kills D'Ken, and names himself Emperor of the Shi'ar. Darwin leaps into the Crystal after Xavier, and soon after emerges with him. During the battle Vulcan kills Corsair, claiming he does not have a father and blaming Corsair for letting his mother die. Now with Xavier's lost telepathy restored by the Crystal, he, along with Nightcrawler, Warpath, Darwin, and Hepzibah, are sent back to Earth by Lilandra locking the ship's programming. Meanwhile, Havok, Marvel Girl, Polaris, Ch'od, Raza, and Korvus form a new team of Starjammers bent on defeating Gabriel (Vulcan) once and for all, and salvaging the remains of the crippled Shi'ar Empire.

Emperor Vulcan
The civil war between Vulcan's forces and those loyal to the dethroned Lilandra rages on. Led by Havok and the Starjammers, Lilandra's forces gradually whittle away at Vulcan's forces, which are plagued by defections. The Shi'ar, contrary to Vulcan's expectations, are not happy to have an outsider as their ruler. Vulcan is discouraged by this, but Deathbird convinces him that they will come to accept him.

Warned in advance of a rebel raid on Feather's Edge, Vulcan and his fleet ambush the Starjammers. However, in the middle of the battle, his ship, the Hammer, is destroyed by the Scy'ar Tal (translates as "Death to the Shi'ar"). Vulcan and Gladiator attack the leader of the Scy'ar Tal and are easily defeated, whereupon they retreat deeper into Shi'ar space.

Marvel Girl makes contact with the Eldest Scy'ar Tal and discovers their true origin: the Scy'ar Tal were originally called the M'Kraan. Early in their history, the Shi'ar attacked them, killing many and causing the rest to flee for their lives. Eventually the Shi'ar, taking over the planet, took the M'kraan Crystal as their own, declaring it the sacred gift of the deities Sharra and K'ythri.

The M'Kraan, changing their name to Scy'ar Tal, then devoted their culture and society to the destruction of the Shi'ar Empire. Even though it is later revealed to the reader that the Scy'ar Tal discovered the M'Kraan Crystal some 13,000 years earlier and eradicated the then-inhabiting species on the planet since they considered the planet to be "holy" — the same thing that the Shi'ar have done to them. With their first attack, they destroyed Feather's Edge by transporting a star to obliterate it.

Vulcan makes contact with the Starjammers to call a temporary ceasefire. Under the ceasefire, the Shi'ar and the Starjammers decide to take out the Finality, thus crippling the Scy'ar's biggest threat. Once Havok and Vulcan are in position to destroy Finality, the Eldest Scy'ar tries to stop them, but Vulcan, discovering the source of the Eldest's power, severs the connection between the Eldest and his brothers, rendering the Eldest powerless and the Scy'ar disorganized. The tide of the battle shifts to the Shi'ar, who proceed to attack not only the Scy'ar, but also the Starjammers. Meanwhile, Vulcan blasts Havok into a sun.

Vulcan decides to use Finality to destroy the Scy'ar by using the weapon to place a star in the middle of their fleet. Havok returns, and, having absorbed enough power to burn him, decides to end things with Vulcan. While they battle, Rachael and Korvus attempt but fail to stop the beacon that will initiate the attack by the Shi'ar. The Shi'ar Imperial Guard end Havok's battle with Vulcan by appearing with the Starjammers in captivity, threatening to kill them. Before surrendering, Havok destroys Finality. With Havok and the Starjammers in custody, Vulcan declares that he will return the Shi'ar Empire to its former glory.

Divided We Stand

Vulcan appears on a monitor of Havok's cell on a prison and taunts him by telling him the events of Messiah Complex. He says the baby, and all of mutantkind's hope is lost. Havok destroys the monitor and says that if one baby can be born so can another, that there is always hope.

X-Men: Kingbreaker

Vulcan begins an aggressive war of conquest to expand the Shi'ar Empire, occupying, among other races, the Z'Nox. All the while, he becomes obsessed with making Havok acknowledge his superiority, which Havok refuses to do. The Starjammers escape their prison, nearly killing Vulcan in the process, and severely wounding Deathbird, but being forced to flee to the Kree Imperium.

War of Kings

After learning of the devastation of the Skrull fleet and the takeover of Hala by the Inhumans, Vulcan launches a surprise attack on the Kree, now ruled by Black Bolt and the Inhuman population of Attilan. The Imperial Guard retrieves Lilandra, whom Vulcan plans to execute. However, he is stopped by one of his admirals, stating that doing so will only make her a martyr and incite factions loyal to her to overthrow him around a similar figurehead. He also abducts Adam Warlock and attacks him.

Soon enough, Lilandra is assassinated in an attempt to usurp Vulcan. Immediately, a civil war ignites in the Imperium between factions loyal to her and Vulcan. Though advised by the Fraternity of Raptors and his admirals to sue for peace and return to their planets to restore order, Vulcan refuses to listen and flies off to engage the Inhumans. He finds Black Bolt with his T-Bomb. Believing Black Bolt intends to destroy his empire, Vulcan engages him. They both apparently die in the resulting explosion that tears a hole in the fabric of space and time. Gladiator then takes Vulcan's place as Majestor of the Shi'ar. It is later revealed that Black Bolt did not die but was instead trapped in the fault, while Vulcan's fate remained unknown.

Dawn of X

Sometime later, Cyclops wrote Vulcan's name as one of several threats the X-Men have to solve, at a time when almost all X-Men disappeared and are presumed dead while trapped in a realm created by Nate Grey, which indicates that Vulcan is in fact alive or simply that Cyclops doesn't know what happened to him during the War of Kings event. Soon afterwards after Xavier used Krakoa's unique abilities to create a new nation for mutants, it is revealed through an infograph that lists off all of the Omega Level mutants known to exist, that Gabriel is indeed alive and mysteriously back on Earth. He is also a loyal citizen of Krakoa and was reunited with his family and his psychotic mind apparently stabilized. Vulcan was accepted with a few acquaintances from the Krakoan mainland who have stretched the acceptable boundaries of decorum. He also appears to have no memory of his time as the mad Emperor of the Shi'ar, although he has the same recurring dream every night of being stuck in the Fault after the War of Kings event, which made him to be prone to heavy drinking. Also, while it wasn't a particularly a trait of his in the past, Vulcan has something of a tendency toward grandiose dialogue and talks incessantly about the fire inside him, which doesn't seem like entirely a stable behavior of his. To complicate matters, a Shi'ar Battle Record of Vulcan's defeat reveals that while the Emperor Vulcan fell into the Fault with Black Bolt, he – like Black Bolt – never died. Later while on the moon, Vulcan finds the Cotati and sees them getting ready to invade Earth. He warns them against invading Krakoa but they capture him and accidentally awaken his fire, allowing him to remember what was done to him in the breach. As it turns out, while in the Fault, Vulcan was plucked to another dimensional plane by a trinity of lovecraftian beings of ancient power and malice known as the Many-Angled-Ones, who plan to use him to conquer the Marvel Universe. They also implied to have tried to captured Black Bolt, but the Midnight King was rescued in time. The alien conclave cast a covetous eye upon Vulcan's power, seeking to turn him into a tool for their own purposes. They tear Vulcan apart on a molecular level to peer into his soul. While assessing his potential for good and for evil, they find a fire within him which they consider "A true power inside a broken and twisted host". Disturbingly, they apparently are only interested in Vulcan's evil side, even considering the potential for good to be a flaw in his existence. They rewrote Vulcan's mind, creating the "good" exterior he has been presenting to the X-Men all this time, a false identity beneath which was subsumed his true persona and returned him back to his universe. Back in the present, Vulcan unleashes his repressed fire and torches all of the Cotati, killing them all. When the rest of the Cotati find out Vulcan has killed their whole battalion, they get ready to invade Krakoa.

Powers and abilities
Vulcan is an Omega-level mutant with the ability to psionically manipulate, control, and absorb vast amounts of energy. In addition to traditional energies of the electromagnetic spectrum, Vulcan has displayed control over exotic energies such as Cyclops' optic blasts and magical energy.

Vulcan has used his powers to produce light, heat, force, and electricity, as well as warp or disable large amounts and different types of existing energy sources, tap into and suppress mutant energies, survive in the vacuum of space, and fly. Outside a planetary atmosphere his flight speed can even reach near the speed of light. He can track energy signatures over vast interstellar distances, as demonstrated when he located a trio of starships. He is able to go without food for long periods by directly absorbing energy, and can generate protective force fields for interstellar travel. He can manipulate electricity within a person's brain and use the powers of others by manipulating their own energy sources, although he needs to be in their presence to achieve this. The exact limits of his power replication abilities are unknown, but he was capable of utilising Marvel Girl's telepathy without her consent. Vulcan also possesses the capability of solidifying energy into solid shapes, in effect simulating telekinesis. When he uses his powers, his eyes glow. He has been confirmed as an Omega level mutant, his powers elevated to said level thanks to absorbing a massive amount of mutant energies from M-Day.

Vulcan is able to use his psionic abilities for a variety of uses. Despite little (if any) formal training in the use of his mental powers, Vulcan has demonstrated feats such as completely resisting mental manipulation/assault by far more experienced telepathic beings, and he was also able to restore former Shi'ar emperor D'Ken from a catatonic state, something the most powerful/skilled telepaths of the entire Shi'ar empire had previously been unable to accomplish. Vulcan does not possess any innate telepathic abilities, but can manipulate the telepathic energies of others (which enables him to shield his mind from outside attacks). In the instance with D'Ken, he used his energy powers to reactivate the electrical connections in the neurons of D'Ken's brain that had been damaged by the M'Krann Crystal.

All three Summers brothers have similar powers, as they are each able to absorb certain kinds of celestial energies and re-channel that energy from their bodies. While his brothers Alex and Scott are known to be immune to each other's powers, they are apparently not immune to Vulcan's; nor is Vulcan immune to Alex's.

Vulcan is capable of absorbing vast amounts of energy in any form. In an engagement, Vulcan forced Adam Warlock to flee after robbing him of most of his power within seconds. Vulcan's absorption abilities, though vast, have limits. He was unable to absorb or deflect a powerful blast from his brother Havok (although at the time Havok was powered beyond his normal levels), leaving Vulcan wounded and at the mercy of his brother. Though high-order energy projection rapidly depletes his reserves, as demonstrated in his fight against Shi'ar warships and later the Imperial Guard, Vulcan's energy manipulation abilities are not based on said energy reserves. He can continue to manipulate external sources of energy even when they are depleted, though he is noticeably weaker when this occurs. Nevertheless, he has been shown to be easily capable of defeating multiple advanced Shi'ar starships when in such a state.

After being swallowed by the soil of Krakoa, he absorbed the powers of his teammates Sway, Darwin, and Petra, giving him their powers of time manipulation, physical adaptation, and earth manipulation respectively. These powers were lost when Rachel Summers was able to give Darwin's psyche the necessary boost to separate himself from Vulcan.

When not in possession of Darwin's powers, Vulcan's body is as vulnerable as any normal human as far as durability is concerned. Blows from Black Bolt were shown to be capable of drawing blood and chipping teeth. When battling the X-Men, Vulcan has been susceptible to physical blows. However, Vulcan can use his energy abilities to create force fields or to rebuild damaged/destroyed portions of his body, the total extent of which is unknown, as Vulcan still required a prosthetic eye after a strike from Gladiator.

According to information from his creator, Ed Brubaker, Vulcan has a "hidden potential" which allows him to fully generate and have control over seven elements (fire, earth, electricity, wind, water, darkness, and light).

Reception
 In 2014, Entertainment Weekly ranked Vulcan 77th in their "Let's rank every X-Man ever" list.

Other versions

Age of X
In the Age of X reality, Vulcan is in an induced coma at Barton-Howell research facility.

What If?
What If? Deadly Genesis explores what would have happened if Vulcan and his team had survived their venture on Krakoa. In this reality, Vulcan and his team make their way through the island, surviving its assault. Vulcan becomes separated from the group and finds the captured X-Men. After accidentally killing them all in a panic, Vulcan escapes the temple and, with the rest of his team, the island itself. Krakoa is then jettisoned into deep space, where it remains untouched for years until being discovered by the Silver Surfer. There, Sway finds a time pocket and uses her powers to replay the events of Vulcan's killings. After confronting and disabling him of his powers, Professor Xavier banishes Vulcan to the island, where he is forced, as punishment, to replay the transpired murders of the X-Men every time he requires food.

A second story, "What If? Rise and Fall of the Shi'ar Empire", examines what would have happened to the Shi'ar Empire if Vulcan had absorbed the energies of the M'Kraan Crystal instead of Professor Xavier, and become the Phoenix.

Collected editions
Vulcan's stories have been collected into trade paperbacks:

Deadly Genesis (200 pages, hardcover, August 2006, softcover, January 2007)
Rise and Fall of the Shi'ar Empire (collects The Uncanny X-Men #475–486, 312 pages, August 2007, hardcover, softcover, February 2008)
Emperor Vulcan (120 pages, May 2008)
Road to War of Kings (collects X-Men: Kingbreaker #1–4, Secret Invasion: War of Kings, and War of Kings Saga, 176 pages, June 2009)

References

External links
 
 Vulcan (Gabriel Summers) at the Marvel Database Project
 Third Summers Brother Article Pre-Vulcan at Uncannyxmen.net
 Release Report for Evil Emperor Vulcan

Characters created by Ed Brubaker
Comics characters introduced in 2006
Fictional characters with absorption or parasitic abilities
Fictional characters with energy-manipulation abilities
Fictional characters with earth or stone abilities
Fictional characters with elemental transmutation abilities
Fictional characters who can manipulate time
Fictional emperors and empresses
Fictional mass murderers
Fictional patricides
Fictional slaves
Galactic emperors
Marvel Comics characters who have mental powers
Marvel Comics extraterrestrial supervillains
Marvel Comics male supervillains
Marvel Comics mutants
Marvel Comics orphans
Shi'ar
X-Men members